The 1992 Russian Women's Cup was the inaugural edition of the premier knockout tournament in Russia for women's football teams following the dissolution of the Soviet Union. It was contested by 38 teams from eleven federal subjects, and won by Interros Moscow, which also won the national championship.

Teams by federal subject

Qualifying round
Zone 1:

Zone 2:

Zone 3:

Zone 4 was decided in a sole play-off match. CSK VVS Samara beat Lada Togliatti 4–2 in penalties after a goalless draw.

Round of 32

|}

Round of 16

|}

Quarter-finals

|}

Semifinals

|}

Final

References

Women's Cup
Russian Women's Cup
Russian Women's Cup